Six ships of the Royal Navy have been named HMS Wolverine, or the alternative spelling Wolverene, after the wolverine:

  was a 14-gun brig-sloop, previously the civilian collier Rattler. She was purchased and converted in 1798 and sunk in action in 1804.
  was an 18-gun  launched in 1805 and sold in 1816.
  was a 16-gun  launched in 1836 and wrecked in 1855.
  was a  wooden screw corvette launched in 1863. She was sent to Australia as a training ship in 1881, and then converted to a mercantile barque. She sailed to Australia in 1895 but defects were discovered and she was hulked there.
  was a  launched in 1919 and sold for scrapping in 1946.

Royal Navy ship names